The 2010 Spanish Athletics Championships was the 90th edition of the national championship in outdoor track and field for Spain. It was held on 17 and 18 July at the Complejo Deportivo de Avilés in Avilés, Asturias. It served as the selection meeting for the 2010 European Athletics Championships. A total of 617 athletes (341 men and 276 women) competed at the event.

The club championships in relays and combined track and field events were contested separately from the main competition.

The original winner of the men's 3000 metres steeplechase, José Luis Blanco in 8:33.12 minutes, was later disqualified as his drug test at the competition came back positive for erythropoietin.

Results

Men

Women

References

Results
XC Campeonato de España Absoluto . Royal Spanish Athletics Federation. Retrieved 2019-07-06.

External links 
 Official website of the Royal Spanish Athletics Federation 

2010
Spanish Athletics Championships
Spanish Championships
Athletics Championships
Sport in Avilés